1972 Emperor's Cup Final was the 52nd final of the Emperor's Cup competition. The final was played at National Stadium in Tokyo on January 1, 1973. Hitachi won the championship.

Overview
Hitachi won their 1st title, by defeating Yanmar Diesel 2–1.

Match details

See also
1972 Emperor's Cup

References

Emperor's Cup
1972 in Japanese football
Kashiwa Reysol matches
Cerezo Osaka matches